Greece competed at the 2016 Summer Paralympics in Rio de Janeiro, Brazil, from 7 September to 18 September 2016. The first places the team qualified were for three athletes in sailing events.

Funding and support
Funding for Greece's national Paralympic committee comes through the Greek  Ministry of Sports and the General Secretariat of Sports.  While Greek Paralympians get some support from their national sport federations, many were also getting support from the Greek NPC. The economic situation in the country led to less funding from the government, which caused the Greeks rely more on sponsorship to serve a stop gap measure. One of the biggest sponsors was OPAP, Greece's national lottery. In a few cases, Greek athletes had to self-fund if they wanted to participate internationally as their NPC did not have the funds.  In 2013, there was also a tremendous discrepancy in funding between Paralympic sport and Olympic sport, with the Olympic side getting €1,400,000 while the Paralympic side got €200,000.

Disability classifications

Every participant at the Paralympics has their disability grouped into one of five disability categories; amputation, the condition may be congenital or sustained through injury or illness; cerebral palsy; wheelchair athletes, there is often overlap between this and other categories; visual impairment, including blindness; Les autres, any physical disability that does not fall strictly under one of the other categories, for example dwarfism or multiple sclerosis. Each Paralympic sport then has its own classifications, dependent upon the specific physical demands of competition. Events are given a code, made of numbers and letters, describing the type of event and classification of the athletes competing. Some sports, such as athletics, divide athletes by both the category and severity of their disabilities, other sports, for example swimming, group competitors from different categories together, the only separation being based on the severity of the disability.

Medalists

| width=78% align=left valign=top |

| width=25% align=left valign=top |

Competitors
The following is the list of number of competitors participating in the Games:

Archery

Dorothea Poimenidou earned Greece a spot at the Rio Games following her performance at the 2015 World Archery Para Championships. She qualified the country after her performance in the women's recurve open.

Women

Athletics

Men

Track

Field

Women

Track

Field

Boccia

Individual

Pairs and Teams

Cycling

Road

Men

Women

Track

Men

Women

Judo

Men

Paracanoeing

Canoe Sprint
Women

Powerlifting

Men

Sailing

Mixed

Shooting

Mixed

Swimming

Men

Women

Mixed

Wheelchair fencing

Men

Women

Wheelchair tennis

Stefanos Diamantis qualified for Rio in the men's singles event via a Bipartite Commission Invitation place.

Men

See also
Greece at the 2016 Summer Olympics

References

Nations at the 2016 Summer Paralympics
2016
2016 in Greek sport